Neurotensin is a 13 amino acid neuropeptide that is implicated in the regulation of luteinizing hormone and prolactin release and has significant interaction with the dopaminergic system.  Neurotensin was first isolated from extracts of bovine hypothalamus based on its ability to cause a visible vasodilation in the exposed cutaneous regions of anesthetized rats.

Neurotensin is distributed throughout the central nervous system, with highest levels in the hypothalamus, amygdala and nucleus accumbens. It induces a variety of effects, including analgesia, hypothermia and increased locomotor activity. It is also involved in regulation of dopamine pathways. In the periphery, neurotensin is found in enteroendocrine cells of the small intestine, where it leads to secretion and smooth muscle contraction.

Sequence and biosynthesis 

Neurotensin shares significant sequence similarity in its 6 C-terminal amino acids with several other neuropeptides, including neuromedin N (which is derived from the same precursor). This C-terminal region is responsible for the full biological activity, the N-terminal portion having a modulatory role. The neurotensin/neuromedin N precursor can also be processed to produce large 125–138 amino acid peptides with the neurotensin or neuromedin N sequence at their C terminus. These large peptides appear to be less potent than their smaller counterparts, but are also less sensitive to degradation and may represent endogenous, long-lasting activators in a number of pathophysiological situations.

The sequence of bovine neurotensin was determined to be pyroGlu-Leu-Tyr-Glu-Asn-Lys-Pro-Arg-Arg-Pro-Tyr-Ile-Leu-OH.  Neurotensin is synthesized as part of a 169 or 170 amino acid precursor protein that also contains the related neuropeptide neuromedin N.  The peptide coding domains are located in tandem near the carboxyl terminal end of the precursor and are bounded and separated by paired basic amino acid (lysine-arginine) processing sites.

Clinical significance

Neurotensin is a potent mitogen for colorectal cancer.

Neurotensin has been implicated in the modulation of dopamine signaling, and produces a spectrum of pharmacological effects resembling those of antipsychotic drugs, leading to the suggestion that neurotensin may be an endogenous neuroleptic.  Neurotensin-deficient mice display defects in responses to several antipsychotic drugs consistent with the idea that neurotensin signaling is a key component underlying at least some antipsychotic drug actions.  These mice exhibit modest defects in prepulse inhibition (PPI) of the startle reflex, a model that has been widely used to investigate antipsychotic drug action in animals.  Antipsychotic drug administration augments PPI under certain conditions.  Comparisons between normal and neurotensin-deficient mice revealed striking differences in the ability of different antipsychotic drugs to augment PPI.  While the atypical antipsychotic drug clozapine augmented PPI normally in neurotensin-deficient mice, the conventional antipsychotic haloperidol and the newer atypical antipsychotic quetiapine were ineffective in these mice, in contrast to normal mice where these drugs significantly augmented PPI.  These results suggest that certain antipsychotic drugs require neurotensin for at least some of their effects.  Neurotensin-deficient mice also display defects in striatal activation following haloperidol, but not clozapine administration in comparison to normal wild type mice, indicating that striatal neurotensin is required for the full spectrum of neuronal responses to a subset of antipsychotic drugs.

Neurotensin is an endogenous neuropeptide involved in thermoregulation that can induce hypothermia and neuroprotection in experimental models of cerebral ischemia.

Gene expression 
Neurotensin gene expression has been shown to be modulated by estrogen in both human SK-N-SH neuroblastoma cell cultures as well as in mice through interactions with cyclic AMP (cAMP) signaling. Specifically, estrogen increased cAMP activity and cAMP response element-binding protein phosphorylation in neuroblastoma cells prior to the induction of neurotensin gene transcription. Additionally, neurotensin gene transcription was blocked in knock-out mice lacking the RIIβ subunit of the protein kinase A holoenzyme. These findings may indicate mechanisms of cross-talk signaling in brain hormone activity and expression of hormone-related genes. Other sex hormone-related changes in neurotensin expression have been associated with activity in the preoptic area. In female rats, neurotensin expression was shown to be at its highest in the medial preoptic area (mPOA) during the proestrus phase of the estrous cycle.

Altered expression of neurotensin genes as well as neurotensin receptor genes have been exhibited in postpartum female mice. While neurotensin receptor 1 (Ntsr1) mRNA in the paraventricular nucleus of the hypothalamus (PVN) was lowered, neurotensin, but not neurotensin mRNA, was shown to be higher in the PVN. Neurotensin mRNA as well as the peptide itself were also expressed higher in the medial preoptic area (mPOA). These expression patterns were not shown in the virgin female control group, and align with other research implicating neurotensin gene expression variation in the regulation of maternal behaviors.

Other patterns of neurotensin expression related to the medial preoptic area show relation to the modulation of social reward. Analysis of neurotensin gene-labelled neurons revealed that neurotensin-containing neuronal projections from the mPOA to the ventral tegmental area (VTA) in mice were associated with the encoding of odor cues as well as social attraction, further implicating neurotensin in hormonal as well as reward signaling.

Neurotensin has also been implicated in learning processes. A study examining song development in male zebra finches showed variations in neurotensin and neurotensin receptor gene expression across different stages of song development. The early stage of transition between sensory and sensorimotor periods was marked by decreases in both neurotensin and neurotensin receptor mRNA expression, which may indicate a role of neurotensin in initiating sensorimotor learning. During the sensorimotor subsong stage, neurotensin gene expression and neurotensin receptor 1 (Ntsr1) gene expression exhibited complementary expression patterns in song-related brain regions, which may indicate changes in neuronal responses to neurotensin across development.

Neurotensin also plays a role in peripheral tissues outside of the nervous system, mainly in the gastrointestinal tract, and has been implicated in cancer development. DNA promoter methylation has been shown to be a major regulator in the expression of neurotensin receptor 1 and 2 genes in colorectal cancer cells. Additionally, knock-down of the NTSR1 gene as well as treatment with a NTSR1 antagonist inhibited colorectal cancer cell proliferation and migration. Leiomyomas or fibroid tumors in uterine tissue have also been associated with higher expression of neurotensin and NTSR1.

See also
 Neurotensin receptor

References

External links
 
 

Neuropeptides